Thomas Patrick Corbett (September 15, 1914May 10, 1995) was an American lawyer, politician, and judge. He also served one term in the Wisconsin State Assembly.

Biography

Born in Marinette, Wisconsin, Corbett and his family moved to Racine, Wisconsin, in 1918. Corbett graduated from St. Catherine's High School and then received his bachelor's degree from Marquette University and his law degree from Marquette University Law School. He briefly practiced law, but was elected to the Wisconsin State Assembly in his first year out of law school, representing the city of Racine, Wisconsin, as a Republican.  He served in the legislature for two years, then, in 1943, enlisted with the United States Navy for service in World War II.

He returned from the war in 1945 and resumed his law practice.  In 1949, the Racine city council appointed him City Attorney, where he remained for the next thirteen years.  In 1961, he was elected to one of the newly created branches of the Racine County court and was instrumental in establishing the court in Burlington, Wisconsin, in the far western part of the county.  He served there until his election as a judge of the Racine-based 21st circuit in 1969.  His service bridged the 1978 reorganization of Wisconsin trial courts, which saw the circuit and county courts merged, and finished his judicial service in 1979 as a judge of the Racine circuit.

After his retirement, Corbett served as a reserve judge in Racine and Waushara counties.

Corbett died at the Veteran's Home in King, Wisconsin.

Family
Corbett married Lucille K. "Terry" Tarro in 1942.  They had two children.

Electoral history

| colspan="6" style="text-align:center;background-color: #e9e9e9;"| Primary Election, September 1940

| colspan="6" style="text-align:center;background-color: #e9e9e9;"| General Election, November 1940

Notes

1914 births
1995 deaths
People from Marinette, Wisconsin
People from Racine, Wisconsin
Marquette University alumni
Marquette University Law School alumni
Military personnel from Wisconsin
Wisconsin state court judges
Republican Party members of the Wisconsin State Assembly
20th-century American judges
20th-century American politicians